Ciaran Fitzgerald (born 4 June 1952) is an Irish former rugby union player. He captained Ireland to the Triple Crown in 1982 and 1985, and the Five Nations Championship in 1983. Fitzgerald also captained the Lions on their 1983 tour. After the conclusion of his playing career, Fitzgerald was coach of the national team.

Early life
Fitzgerald was born in Loughrea, County Galway.

Rugby career
Fitzgerald first played rugby while at Garbally College, and was chosen to play hooker by teacher and priest John Kirby. Fitzgerald played for University College Galway, and then went on to play senior rugby for St. Mary's College in Dublin.

Fitzgerald rose to prominence in the game, and made his test debut for  against Australia on 3 June 1979, during an Irish tour of Australia. He captained Ireland to the Triple Crown in 1982 and 1985, and the Five Nations Championship in 1983. Fitzgerald's last test came against Scotland on 15 March 1986 in that year's Five Nations Championship. In total, Fitzgerald received 22 competitive and three friendly caps for Ireland. He scored once, a try against Wales, in the 1980 Five Nations. Fitzgerald also captained the British and Irish Lions team on their 1983 tour, when the team travelled to New Zealand and were beaten in each test against the All Blacks.

Other activities
Though most widely remembered for playing rugby union, Fitzgerald was an accomplished sportsman, winning two All-Ireland boxing championships. He also played minor hurling for Galway the team he played with reached the minor final against Cork in 1970.

Fitzgerald studied at University College Galway, gaining a Bachelor's degree in 1973. Playing in the amateur era, Fitzgerald also maintained a career in the Irish Army. Fitzgerald also served as aide-de-camp to the President, Dr Patrick Hillery.

Fitzgerald is an Irish Labour Party supporter and voter.

Coaching and media
Following his retirement from playing, Fitzgerald has continued to be involved in the game, and served as head coach of Ireland from 1990 to 1992, leading the side to the 1991 Rugby World Cup, where they reached the quarter-finals.

He has also had a career in media, appearing on Setanta Sports and RTÉ, the Irish national TV and radio service, as a rugby pundit.

Appearances
 
 1979:  Australia W 27–12 Brisbane
 1979:  Australia W 9–3 Sydney
 1980:  England L 24–9 Twickenham
 1980:  Scotland W 22–15 Lansdowne Road
 1980:  France L 19–18 Parc des Princes
 1980:  Wales W 21–7 Lansdowne Road
 1982:  Wales W 20–12 Lansdowne Road
 1982:  England W 16–15 Twickenham
 1982:  Scotland W 21–12 Lansdowne Road
 1982:  France L 22–9 Parc des Princes
 1983:  Scotland W 15–13 Murrayfield
 1983:  France W 22–16 Lansdowne Road
 1983:  Wales L 23–9 Cardiff Arms Park
 1983:  England W 25–15 Lansdowne Road
 1984:  France L 25–12 Parc des Princes
 1984:  Wales L 18–9 Lansdowne Road
 1984:  Australia L 16–9 Lansdowne Road
 1985:  Scotland W 18–15 Murrayfield
 1985:  France D 15–15 Lansdowne Road
 1985:  Wales W 21–9 Cardiff Arms Park
 1985:  England W 13–10 Lansdowne Road
 1986:  France L 29–9 Parc des Princes
 1986:  Wales L 19–12 Lansdowne Road
 1986:  England L 25–20 Twickenham
 1986:  Scotland L 10–9 Lansdowne Road

References

External links
 Sporting heroes
 1983 New Zealand British & Irish Lions Tour
 Irish Rugby Web Site
 Irish Rugby Web Site

1952 births
Living people
Alumni of the University of Galway
British & Irish Lions rugby union players from Ireland
Connacht Rugby players
Galway hurlers
Ireland international rugby union players
Ireland national rugby union team coaches
Irish Army officers
Irish rugby union coaches
Irish rugby union players
Loughrea hurlers
University of Galway RFC players
People educated at Garbally College
People from Loughrea
Rugby union hookers
Rugby union players from County Galway
St Mary's College RFC players